STN  may refer to:

Broadcasting 
 Score Television Network, a Canadian specialty channel
 Shalimar Television Network, a Pakistani television network
 Student Television Network, in the United States

Transport 
 London Stansted Airport, England
 Stanley station (North Dakota), an Amtrak station
 Stonehaven railway station, Scotland

Other uses 
 Owa language
 São Tomé and Príncipe dobra currency
 Schaghticoke Tribal Nation
 Stantec, a Canadian architectural and engineering consulting firm
 State transition network
 STN International, an information service
 Subthalamic nucleus, a subcortical structure in the brain
 Super-twisted nematic display, a type of liquid crystal display
 Szczecin Scientific Society, a Polish learned society

See also
 Public switched telephone network
 Station (disambiguation)